The 2009 Junior League World Series took place from August 16–22 in Taylor, Michigan, United States. Scottsdale, Arizona defeated Oranjestad, Aruba in the championship game.

Teams

Results

United States Pool

International Pool

Elimination Round

References

Junior League World Series
Junior League World Series